Surangel S. Whipps (born 21 February 1941) is a Palauan businessman and politician. He served as the president of the Senate of Palau from January 2005 to April 2005, and from 25 April 2007 to 15 January 2009, and as the speaker of the House of Delegates of Palau from January 1993 to November 1996. He was born in Airai.

He graduated from University of Baltimore in 1971 and returned to Palau in 1972. He began his political career in 1982 when he was elected in his home state, Ngatpang. In 1984, he was elected by to the House of Delegates of Palau in the Second Olbiil Era Kelulau. He served 16 years in the House of Delegates. He also founded Surangel and Sons Company, of which Ksau's Motors, the only Toyota dealer in Palau, is owned by the company.

His son, Surangel Whipps Jr., became the 10th President of Palau in 2021.

Politics
In January 2008, Whipps proposed a bill requiring the minimum wage to apply not just to Palauans, but to non-resident workers as well. It was reasoned that this would help more Palauans to become employed, due to the increased cost of hiring non-resident workers.

References

1941 births
Living people
Presidents of the Senate of Palau
Speakers of the House of Delegates of Palau
Palauan businesspeople
People from Airai
University of Baltimore alumni
21st-century Palauan politicians